Lindә́i  is the name of the ninth month of the Afghan calendar. It occurs in the late autumn season (from November 21/22 to December 20/21). It has 30 days.

Lindә́i corresponds with the tropical Zodiac sign Sagittarius. Lindә́i literally means "bow" in Pashto.

Observances 
 Thanksgiving Day (United States) - 1st Thursday of Leendai
 Black Friday in the United States (shopping holiday, also marked in most other countries) - 1st Friday of Leendai
 Small Business Saturday in the United States - 1st Saturday of Leendai
 Cyber Monday - 2nd Monday of Leendai
 Giving Tuesday - 2nd Tuesday of Leendai
 Small Business Saturday (UK) - 2nd Saturday of Leendai
 Anniversary of the formation of the National Hockey League - 5 or 6 Leendai
 Afghan Armed Forces Day - 10 Leendai
 Pearl Harbor Day - 17 or 18 Leendai
 Black Friday in the United Kingdom - Last Friday of Leendai, may be occasionally celebrated on the first Friday of Marǧūmay before Western Christmas to match the date in the Gregorian calendar (held every last Friday before Christmas in the Gregorian calendar)
 Yaldā Night - 31 Leendai

References

Pashto names for the months of the Solar Hijri calendar